Röderbach  is a river of Bavaria, Germany. It is a left tributary of the Aschaff near Goldbach.

See also
List of rivers of Bavaria

References 

Rivers of Bavaria
Rivers of Germany